The Mahakal Temple or Mahakal Mandir (. Translation: The master of Kaal[time]) is a sacred Hindu temple located in Darjeeling in the state of West Bengal, India dedicated to the Hindu god Shiva, the third god in the Hindu triumvirate. The Temple was built in 1782 by Lama Dorjey Rinzing and is perched atop the Observatory Hill in Darjeeling and is an amalgamation of Hindu and Buddhist religions. It is a unique religious site where both religions coexist harmoniously.

History
Mahakal Temple stands as a historical edifice on the spot where a Buddhist Monastery named 'Dorje-Ling' once stood which was built by Lama Dorjey Rinzing in 1765. Prior to that it is believed that the spot was a sacred spot of the aboriginal Lepcha folks. Later a monastery was constructed on the spot and worshipped by both Lepchas and Bhutias. 

It was after the invasion of the Gurkha Army around 1788 that the monastery was desecrated and destroyed by the invading troops and in course of time the sacred place overwhelmingly began to represent the Hindu symbolisms of the majority Nepali community. Legend has it that three Shiva-Lingas representing Brahma, Vishnu and Maheshwar (Shiva) manifested themselves at the site in 1782. The monastery itself was plundered and destroyed in 1815 during the Gorkha invasion after which it was shifted to Bhutia Busty about a mile away and was called the Bhutia Busty Monastery. The Temple is a much revered and visited religious shrine of the area.

Legend has it that the name Darjeeling was derived from the name of the monastery 'Dorje-Ling' itself.

Temple complex 
The main Mahakal temple is devoted to Shiva and it witness devotees from all sections of society and religions most visiting the temple for both leisure or pilgrimage. Bells and hundreds of colorful prayer flags line the up-hill walk and the shrine.

The three gold plated Lingams inside the main temple represent Hindu Gods Brahma, Bishnu and Maheswar. There are idols of Buddha alongside the Lingams where both a Hindu priest and a Buddhist monk perform religious rituals and offer prayers simultaneously.

Within the temple complex is a white 'chorten' (Tibetan memorial shrine) where lies the relics of Dorjey  Rinzing Lama the original builder of the site. Dotted around are many other smaller shrines and temples  dedicated to Goddess Kali, Goddess Durga,  Saat Kanya Bhagavati Devi, Ganesha, Krishna, Rama,  Shirdi Sai Baba, Hanuman, Goddess Parvati, Radha and other Gods and Goddesses.

Location

Mahakal Temple is located behind the Chowrasta and encircled by the Mall Road on the ridge of Darjeeling town. The approach is an uphill narrow road about 100 yards from the Mall and is accessible by foot only.

Geographic significance 
The Observatory Hill itself is rich in flora and fauna unique to the Himalayan range of mountains and the full range of third highest peak in the world mount Kanchenjunga can be witnessed from atop the temple complex.

See also 
 Chowrasta Darjeeling
 Observatory Hill, Darjeeling
 Bhutia Busty Monastery
 Dhirdham Temple

References

 

Shiva temples in West Bengal
Temples in India
Places in Hindu worship
Tourist attractions in Darjeeling
Buildings and structures in Darjeeling district